Fryderyk Sapieha (before 1599 - 1650) was a Polish-Lithuanian noble from Polish–Lithuanian Commonwealth. Voivode of Mścisław (1647-1650), podkomorzy of Vitebsk (from 1620), starost of Ostryń (from 1611). Studied in Vilnius and Ingolstadt. Deputy to Sejm in 1624. Fought in the Polish-Swedish War (1625–1629) and Smolensk War with Muscovy (1633-1634).

1590s births
1650 deaths
Fryderyk
Members of the Sejm of the Polish–Lithuanian Commonwealth
Military personnel of the Polish–Lithuanian Commonwealth
Polish people of the Smolensk War